The Ceara woodcreeper or Atlantic woodcreeper (Xiphorhynchus atlanticus) is a species of bird in the woodcreeper subfamily (Dendrocolaptinae). It is found in northeastern Brazil. Its natural habitats are subtropical or tropical moist lowland forest and subtropical or tropical moist montane forest.

References

Ceara woodcreeper
Birds of Brazil
Ceara woodcreeper
Ceara woodcreeper